The Khentei-Daur Highlands, also known as Khentei-Chikoy Highlands (Хэнтэ́й-Чико́йское наго́рье) are a mountainous area in the Transbaikal Krai, Far Eastern Federal District, Russia.

Owing to a number of factors —such as tectonic faults, rock fissuring, and density of river networks— the Khentei-Daur Highlands are the second region in the Transbaikal area regarding the formation and occurrence of aufeis (naleds) sheets.

Geography  
The Khentei-Daur Highlands are a mountain region located at the southwestern limits of Transbaikal Krai, near the border with northeastern Mongolia.They include a number of medium height mountain ranges, as well as a wide intermontane basin, the Altan-Kyrin Depression. 

The area of the highlands is limited by the valley of the Chikoy River to the northwest, beyond which rises the Malkhan Range of the Selenga Highlands (Селенгинское среднегорье). the Menza River, main tributary of the Chikoy, flows to the west, and the Onon River to the east, with the Mongolian border to the south. The Daur Range (Даурский хребет) stretches northeastwards from the northeastern limit of the highlands. The mountains  are characterized by steep slopes, with kurums and rocky ledges. Some of the highest ridges are crowned by Goltsy-type (гольцы) bare rocky summits. There are some traces of Pleistocene glaciation in mountain ridges and river valleys across the highlands.

Subranges
The main subranges of the Khentei-Daur Highlands are: 
Menzin Range, highest point Kurepin,  
Asin Range, highest point Belaya Griva,  
Burkal Range, highest point Zyryanka,  
Esutay Range, highest point Asakansky Golets,  
Chikokon Range, highest point Bystrinsky Golets, highest point of the highlands
Zhergokon Range, highest point Zhergokonsky Golets,  
Pereval Range, highest point Kumylsky Golets  
Khentei Range, highest point Golets Sokhondo,  
Onon-Baldzhin Range, highest point  
Chatangin Range, highest point  
Stanovik Range, highest point

Flora
The prevailing forest cover of the ranges of the Khentei-Daur Highlands is mountain taiga, as well as pre-alpine woodland, with thickets of dwarf stone pine at higher altitudes. The Sokhondo Nature Reserve of the highlands is part of the Trans-Baikal conifer forests ecoregion.

See also
Chikoy National Park
Sokhondo Nature Reserve
Transbaikal

References

External links

The Permian of the Transbaikal region, eastern Russia: Biostratigraphy, correlation and biogeography
Physiogeography of the Russian Far East